The Chief Executive of the Islamic Republic of Afghanistan  was a position within the Government of Afghanistan that served as head of government of Afghanistan. The extra-constitutional post was created in September 2014 following the disputes that arose after the 2014 Afghan presidential election when both Ashraf Ghani and Abdullah Abdullah claimed victory in that election. As part of a National Unity Agreement, it was agreed that Ashraf Ghani would assume the presidency and a new post of Chief Executive of the Islamic Republic of Afghanistan would be created for Abdullah Abdullah.

After his claim as president, disputed with Ghani, the post is currently not in use.

Role and Responsibilities

List of chief executive officers

See also
President of Afghanistan
List of heads of state of Afghanistan
Prime Minister of Afghanistan

References

External links

Politics of Afghanistan